Loabi Vevijje is an upcoming Maldivian romantic film directed by Ali Seezan. Produced by Shaniz Ali and Aminath Shanaaz under S Production, the film stars Ahmed Nimal, Ali Seezan, Mariyam Azza, Ahmed Easa, Ali Azim and Irufana Ibrahim in pivotal roles.

Cast 
 Ahmed Nimal
 Ali Seezan
 Mariyam Azza
 Aminath Rishfa
 Ahmed Easa as Maajidh
 Ali Azim as Haseeb
 Abdullah Shafiu Ibrahim 
 Irufana Ibrahim
 Ali Shameel
 Aminath Nisha

Development
During the shooting of the film, Andhirikan (2020), on 26 September 2019, director Seezan announced the title of his upcoming film as Loabi Vevijje. Pre-production of the film, including finalizing the script, songs recording and mixing was proceeded during the next two months. The film was officially launched on 11 December 2019. Filming commenced on 24 December 2019 in GDh. Thinadhoo and continued till 8 January 2020. Apart from Thinadhoo, some scenes of the film were shot in Sri Lanka during March 2020. Filming was halted due to the COVID-19 pandemic, with two scenes pending to be shot in Male'. In May 2022, it was reported that Aishath Rishmy was roped in to direct some songs of the film. With the indication of cinema re-opening, post COVID-19, the crew resumed the shoot of the remaining scenes of the film, including the songs in GDh. Thinadhoo.

Soundtrack
The first single of the film "Miss Veyey", a bonus song of the film's soundtrack album, performed by Abdul Hannan Moosa Didi after a long hiatus, was released on 14 February 2021, on the occasion of Valentines Day.

Release
The film was scheduled for theatrical release for mid-2020, but was postponed due to the COVID-19 pandemic. In January 2023, makers of the film announced that Loabi Vevijje will be released in theatres on 3 May 2023, as the second Maldivian film to be screened at Olympus Cinema, after its re-opening in February 2023.

References

Maldivian romantic drama films
Upcoming films
Films postponed due to the COVID-19 pandemic
Films directed by Ali Seezan
Dhivehi-language films